The Albatros C.VII was a German military reconnaissance aircraft which saw service during World War I. It was a revised and re-engined development of the Albatros C.V, which had proved disappointing in service.

Design & development
The C.VII dispensed with the earlier C.V's unreliable Mercedes D.IV and also with the modifications that had been made to accommodate that powerplant, returning to the original C.V/16 design. Refinements were also made to the control surfaces, the overall effect was an aircraft with excellent handling qualities.  The C.VII soon made up the bulk of German reconnaissance aircraft, with some 350 in service at one time.

Variants
C.VI

N.I
Night-bomber variant.
L 18
 A single C.VII converted for civil use post WWI

Operators

 Luftstreitkräfte

Specifications (C.VII)

References

 

 
 

Biplanes
Single-engined tractor aircraft
1910s German military reconnaissance aircraft
C.07
Aircraft first flown in 1916